The Marching Hundred (or Hundred) is the marching band of Indiana University. The Marching Hundred is the product of tradition dating back to the organization of the first band at Indiana in 1896, which was founded to provide recreation for interested students. The 22-piece band of 1896 grew to 47 members by 1913.  The current band performs at all home Indiana Hoosiers football games, one away game, several campus events, and bowl game appearances. Toward the end of each season, the Marching Hundred holds an annual Showcase Concert in Indiana University's Assembly Hall. The Marching Hundred is the recipient of the 2007 Sudler Trophy. In 2012, the Marching Hundred performed a five-minute pregame show at Super Bowl XLVI.

"Marching Hundred" name

Prior to the late 1920s, Indiana's marching band was simply known as the "Indiana University Band." The name "Marching Hundred" traces its origins to the 1927 season, when the band traveled to Boston for a game against Harvard University. During the pregame show at Harvard, the band marched in a 10x10 block, and radio broadcasters dubbed them "Indiana's Marching and Playing 100." The band gained recognition from these broadcasters for its halftime show at Harvard, in which the band spelled out "HARVARD" in a continuous drill, forming each letter successively as they marched across the field. The name given by the radio broadcasters became popular, and starting in 1928, the Indiana University Band began formally branding itself as the "Marching Hundred" in announcements and publications. By the time the band expanded to 150 members under Dr. Ronald Gregory in the late 1950s, the name was entrenched. Despite the name, the Marching Hundred has had as many as 320 members, and membership has rarely dropped below 200 in recent decades.

Bowl games and other appearances

The band's appearances have included: the Kentucky Derby (1939), the Presidential Inaugural Parade (1953), the Rose Bowl (1968), the Holiday Bowl (1979), the All-American Bowl (1986), the Peach Bowl (1988 and 1990), the Liberty Bowl (1988), the Copper Bowl (1991), the Independence Bowl (1993), the Insight Bowl (2007), the Pinstripe Bowl (2015), the Foster Farms Bowl (2016), and the Gator Bowl (2020).

Returning from the 2006 away trip to Ohio State University the Marching Hundred stopped in Indianapolis, IN to play at halftime during an Indianapolis Colts game at the RCA Dome.  After this original performance, the Marching Hundred was invited back to the RCA dome to perform for the Indianapolis Colts' first playoff game in January 2007.  However, due to the Colts not achieving home field advantage throughout the playoffs, the Hundred was not able to perform.  The following season, the Hundred performed as the halftime entertainment for the Colts' season opener on Thursday, 6 September 2007.  For the 2008 season, the Hundred performed for the Indianapolis Colts at their first regular season game at Lucas Oil Stadium making it the first marching band to perform on the field at the brand new stadium. Additionally in 2008, the Marching Hundred was asked to perform for a Chicago Bears game at Soldier Field.

Super Bowl XLVI

On Saturday, February 5, 2012, the Marching Hundred performed a five-minute pregame show at Super Bowl XLVI in Indianapolis, Indiana. The Hundred performed their signature song "Sing, Sing, Sing" and "ROCK in the USA" written by John Mellencamp, who lives in Bloomington, Indiana. The Hundred performed "R.O.C.K. in the USA" at the request of the NFL in order to demonstrate the culture of Indiana. Although the Hundred's performance was not completely televised, they could be seen in the background as the sports casters were talking about the game.

References

External links
Official website
Detailed database of shows between 1970 and 2007
Sound library of all school songs as performed by the Marching Hundred

Big Ten Conference marching bands
Indiana University
1896 establishments in Indiana
Musical groups established in 1896